Lauranza Doliman (born c. 1982) is a beauty pageant contestant  from Guadeloupe.  She was the first contestant of her island to have competed in Miss World.  After winning Miss Guadeloupe World 2003, she competed in Miss World 2003 in China, winning the Miss World Elegance award.  She also won he title of Miss Tourism Universe 2003.

She studied for a degree in Tourism.

References

1980s births
Living people
Miss World 2003 delegates
Guadeloupean beauty pageant winners